Montgai is a municipality in the province of Lleida and autonomous community of Catalonia, Spain. It is situated in the valley of the river Sió among the hills of Bellmunt in the south and the mountains of Montclar in the north.

The municipality consists of two villages: Montgai and Butsènit d'Urgell.

Economy 
The economy is based in the agricultural activities. The expansion of cultivated land is quite divided between dry and irrigated land.

Population 
In the 20th century Montgai had 27 houses, and increased the number of inhabitants until the 1930s. Then, it started a decrease because of economic crisis in the agriculture, and today there are 663 citizens.

Montgai: the village 
In the middle of the village there is the church Mare de Déu de l'Assumpció, built in the mid-eighteenth century.

Butsènit d'Urgell

References

External links
 Government data pages 

Municipalities in Noguera (comarca)